Lupinus pratensis is a species of lupine known by the common name Inyo meadow lupine. It is endemic to California, where it grows in the central Sierra Nevada and adjacent plateau and valleys to the east. It grows in relatively moist habitat, such as streambanks and spring meadows. The leaves are borne on long petioles which can reach  in length. The herbage is green and coated in thin hairs. The inflorescence is a dense raceme of many flowers each around a centimeter long. The flower is dark blue or purple with a reddish or orange patch on its banner.

There are two varieties of this species; the rarer, variety, eriostachyus, is known only from the drainage of Big Pine Creek in Inyo County.

References

External links
Jepson Manual Treatment
Photo gallery

pratensis
Endemic flora of California
Flora without expected TNC conservation status